Clyde F. E. Roper (born 1937) is a zoologist at the National Museum of Natural History in Washington, D.C. He has organised a number of expeditions to New Zealand to study giant squid, including in 1997 and 1999. He graduated from Transylvania University in Lexington, Kentucky, in 1959.

Long associated with the National Museum of Natural History, he joined the Smithsonian Institution in 1966.

He was featured in an episode of Errol Morris' TV series First Person (Season 1, Episode 7).

Roper has two adult children and five grandchildren.

See also
 Crittercam

References

External links

 NMNH emeritus staff profile
 Older NMNH biography
 Smithsonian Journeys profile

21st-century American zoologists
Teuthologists
Living people
Transylvania University alumni
1937 births